Zhou Yongchang (1922–2017) was a Chinese physician and a pioneering sonographer in mainland China. Zhou was born in November, 1922 in Shanghai. Graduating from Tong De Medical College, he became an urologist. In the late 1950s, Zhou and his colleagues tried to apply industrial ultrasonic testing for medical diagnosis. In 1988, together with four other people, he was presented with the "History of Medical Ultrasound Pioneer Award" by the World Federation of Ultrasound in Medicine and Biology (WFUMB). He is the maternal  grandfather of singer and artist Jackson Wang.

Zhou died on 24 October 2017.

References 

1922 births
2017 deaths
Chinese urologists
Academic staff of Shanghai Jiao Tong University
20th-century Chinese physicians
Scientists from Shanghai
Educators from Shanghai
Physicians from Shanghai